Dexopollenia yuphae is a species of cluster fly in the family Polleniidae.

Distribution
Laos, Vietnam, Thailand.

References

Polleniidae
Insects described in 1995
Diptera of Asia